The 2013 Campeonato Amazonense de Futebol was the 97th season of Amazonas' top professional football league. The competition began on February 16, and ended on May 26. Princesa do Solimões won the championship by the first time, while Rio Negro and Tarumã were relegated.

Format
The tournament consists of a double round-robin format, in which all twelve teams play each other twice, with classification split in two stages. Each round counts as one stage. The four better-placed teams of each stage will face themselves in playoffs matches, and the first stage champion will face the second stage champion. If the same team win both stages, it will be considered the champion.

The bottom two teams on overall classification will be relegated.

Qualifications
The champion qualifies to 2014 Campeonato Brasileiro Série D. The champion and the runner-up qualify to the 2014 Copa do Brasil.

Participating teams

First stage

First round (Taça Estado do Amazonas)

Standings

Group A

Group B

Results

Group A

Group B

Playoffs

Semifinals

First leg

Second leg

Finals

Second round (Taça Cidade de Manaus)

Standings

Group A

Group B

Results

Playoffs

Semifinals

First leg

Second leg

Finals

Final stage

Princesa do Solimões is the champion of 2013 Campeonato Amazonense

Final standings

References

Amazonense
Campeonato Amazonense